Aimee Wall is a Canadian writer and translator from Grand Falls-Windsor, Newfoundland and Labrador, whose debut novel We, Jane was longlisted for the 2021 Giller Prize and the 2022 Amazon.ca First Novel Award.

She has translated works by Vickie Gendreau, Jean-Philippe Baril Guérard, Maude Veilleux and Alexie Morin.

References

External links

21st-century Canadian novelists
21st-century Canadian women writers
21st-century Canadian translators
Canadian women novelists
People from Grand Falls-Windsor
Writers from Newfoundland and Labrador
Living people
Year of birth missing (living people)